German submarine U-459 was a Type XIV supply and replenishment U-boat (Milchkuh or 'milk cow') of Nazi Germany's Kriegsmarine during World War II.

Her keel was laid down on 22 November 1940 by Deutsche Werke in Kiel as yard number 290. The submarine was launched on 13 September 1941 and commissioned on 15 November, with Kapitänleutnant Georg von Wilamowitz-Moellendorff in command; he remained in charge until the boat was lost, receiving promotion to Korvettenkapitän in the process.

Design
German Type XIV submarines were shortened versions of the Type IXDs they were based on. U-459 had a displacement of  when at the surface and  while submerged. She had two shafts and two propellers.

U-459 was not fitted with torpedo tubes or deck guns, but had two  SK C/30 anti-aircraft guns with 2500 rounds as well as a  C/30 guns with 3000 rounds. The boat had a complement of fifty-three.

Operational career
U-459 conducted six patrols, but as a supply boat, she avoided combat. The submarine initially served in the 4th U-boat Flotilla, for training, before moving on to the 10th (in April 1942) and the 12th flotillas (in November of the same year), for operations.

First and second patrols
Having moved from Kiel to Helgoland U-459 set-off for occupied France, arriving in St. Nazaire on 15 May 1942, after traversing the north-central Atlantic. Her captain, von Wilamowitz-Moellendorf, was 48, one of the oldest skippers at the time.

Her second patrol began on 6 June 1942. It was at about this time that von Wilamowitz-Moellendorf was promoted to Korvettenkapitän.

Third and fourth patrols
Her third foray saw the boat sail into the south Atlantic, as far as Namibia. She departed St. Nazaire on 18 August 1942 and returned on 4 November.

Her fourth patrol was her longest, from 20 December 1942 to 7 March 1943, a total of 78 days. She started in St. Nazaire and finished in Bordeaux. This voyage included sailing toward Cameroon, the boat's nearest position to that country was reached on 18 January 1943.

Fifth and sixth patrols and loss
Her fifth patrol began when she left Bordeaux on 20 April 1943. On 30 May, she shot down a British Whitley aircraft. She was also attacked, on the same day, by an RAF Liberator with a total of ten depth charges. U-459 was not damaged but her AA guns caused slight damage to the attacking Liberator.

She returned to her French base on 30 May.

Having left Bordeaux on 22 July 1943, U-459 was attacked by two British Wellington aircraft of No. 172 Squadron RAF near Cape Ortegal, Spain on 24 July. The boat shot one of the Wellingtons down, but 18 submarine crewmen were killed and she was so badly damaged by this attack that she had to be scuttled. 41 of her crew survived to be taken prisoner.

Wolfpacks
U-459 took part in one wolfpack, namely:
 Eisbär (25 August – 1 September 1942)

References

Bibliography

External links

German Type XIV submarines
U-boats commissioned in 1941
U-boats scuttled in 1943
U-boats sunk by British aircraft
1941 ships
World War II submarines of Germany
World War II shipwrecks in the Atlantic Ocean
Ships built in Kiel
Maritime incidents in July 1943